The 1970 VI FIBA International Christmas Tournament "Trofeo Raimundo Saporta" was the 6th edition of the FIBA International Christmas Tournament. It took place at Sports City of Real Madrid Pavilion, Madrid, Spain, on 24, 25 and 26 December 1970 with the participations of Real Madrid (champions of the 1969–70 Liga Española de Baloncesto), Juventud Nerva, Gimnasia y Esgrima and Puerto Rico.

League stage

Day 1, December 24, 1970

|}

Day 2, December 25, 1970

|}

Day 3, December 26, 1970

|}

Final standings

References

1970–71 in European basketball
1970–71 in Spanish basketball